Ivan Matskevich (born 8 May 1991) is a Belarusian professional handball player who plays as a goalkeeper for AEK Athens and the Belarusian national team.

Career
Ivan signed a two-year contract, starting next season, with AEK Athens handball club of the Greek Handball Championship on March 19, 2022.

References

External links

1991 births
Living people
Belarusian male handball players
People from Lepiel
Expatriate handball players
Belarusian expatriate sportspeople in Romania
Sportspeople from Vitebsk Region